The 2019–20 season is Brisbane Roar's 15th participating in the A-League and in the FFA Cup for the 6th time. Brisbane also announced they would split home A-League games between Suncorp Stadium and Dolphin Oval in Redcliffe.

On 24 March 2020, the FFA announced that the 2019–20 A-League season would be postponed until further notice due to the COVID-19 pandemic in Australia and New Zealand, and subsequently extended indefinitely. The season resumed on 17 July 2020.

Players

Transfers

Transfers in

Transfers out

From youth squad

Contract extensions

Technical staff

Squad statistics

Appearances and goals

{| class="wikitable sortable plainrowheaders" style="text-align:center"
|-
! rowspan="2" |
! rowspan="2" |
! rowspan="2" style="width:180px;" |Player
! colspan="2" style="width:87px;" |A-League
! colspan="2" style="width:87px;" |FFA Cup
! colspan="2" style="width:87px;" |Total
|-
!
!Goals
!
!Goals
!
!Goals
|-
|1
|GK
! scope="row" | Max Crocombe

|6
|0

|0
|0

!6
!0
|-
|2
|DF
! scope="row" | Scott Neville

|21
|2

|2
|0

!23
!0
|-
|3
|DF
! scope="row" | Corey Brown

|10
|1

|0
|0

!10
!1
|-
|4
|DF
! scope="row" | Daniel Bowles

|8+3
|0

|0
|0

!11
!0
|-
|5
|DF
! scope="row" | Tom Aldred

|21
|1

|2
|0

!23
!1
|-
|6
|DF
! scope="row" | Macaulay Gillesphey

|22
|1

|2
|0

!24
!1
|-
|7
|FW
! scope="row" | Jai Ingham

|0+7
|0

|0+2
|0

!9
!0
|-
|8
|MF
! scope="row" | Jacob Pepper

|12
|0

|0+1
|0

!13
!0
|-
|10
|MF
! scope="row" | Brad Inman

|18+3
|4

|2
|1

!23
!5
|-
|12
|MF
! scope="row" | Aiden O'Neill

|14+3
|0

|0+1
|0

!18
!0
|-
|14
|MF
! scope="row" | George Mells

|0
|0

|0+1
|0

!1
!0
|-
|15
|DF
! scope="row" | Aaron Reardon

|0
|0

|0
|0

!0
!0
|-
|19
|DF
! scope="row" | Jack Hingert

|13
|0

|0
|0

!13
!0
|-
|20
|FW
! scope="row" | Aaron Amadi-Holloway

|5+13
|1

|0
|0

!18
!1
|-
|21
|GK
! scope="row" | Jamie Young

|16
|0

|2
|0

!18
!0
|-
|22
|DF
! scope="row" | Jake McGing

|6+2
|0

|2
|0

!10
!0
|-
|23
|FW
! scope="row" | Dylan Wenzel-Halls

|8+8
|1

|0
|0

!16
!1
|-
|25
|MF
! scope="row" | Rahmat Akbari

|2+3
|0

|2
|0

!7
!0
|-
|26
|MF
! scope="row" | Jay O'Shea

|22
|1

|2
|0

!24
!1
|-
|27
|DF
! scope="row" | Kai Trewin

|0+1
|0

|0
|0

!1
!0
|-
|28
|DF
! scope="row" | Izaack Powell

|0+4
|0

|0
|0

!4
!0
|-
|29
|DF
! scope="row" | Jordan Courtney-Perkins

|4+1
|0

|2
|0

!7
!0
|-
|30
|FW
! scope="row" | Mirza Muratovic

|7+5
|2

|0
|0

!12
!2
|-
|31
|GK
! scope="row" | Macklin Freke

|0
|0

|0
|0

!0
!0
|-
|77
|FW
! scope="row" | Scott McDonald

|8+1
|4

|0
|0

!9
!4
|-
!colspan="14"|Players no longer at the club
|-
|9
|FW
! scope="row" | Roy O'Donovan

|9+3
|6

|2
|1

!14
!7
|-
|13
|MF
! scope="row" | Stefan Mauk

|9+1
|1

|2
|1

!12
!2
|-
|24
|DF
! scope="row" | Connor O'Toole

|2
|0

|0+2
|0

!4
!0
|}

Disciplinary record

Pre-season

Friendlies

Competitions

Overview
{|class="wikitable" style="text-align:left"
|-
!rowspan=2 style="width:140px;"|Competition
!colspan=8|Record
|-
!style="width:30px;"|
!style="width:30px;"|
!style="width:30px;"|
!style="width:30px;"|
!style="width:30px;"|
!style="width:30px;"|
!style="width:30px;"|
!style="width:50px;"|
|-
|A-League

|-
|FFA Cup

|-
!Total

FFA Cup

A-League

League table

Results summary

Result by round

Matches

Finals series

References

External links
 Official Website

2019–20 A-League season by team
Brisbane Roar FC seasons